The 2013 A Lyga, also known as SMSCredit.lt A Lyga for sponsoring purposes, is the 24th season of the A Lyga, the top-tier association football league of Lithuania. The season starts on 9 March 2013 and ends on 10 November 2013. FK Ekranas are the defending champions.

Changes from 2012 

The league changed its number of teams for the fourth time in a row, reducing it from ten teams in 2012 A Lyga to nine sides. As a consequence, the schedule reduced from 36 to 32 matches per team, with each team playing every other team four times in total, twice at home and twice away.

Stadiums and locations

League table

Results

First half of season

Second half of season

Top goalscorers

References 

LFF Lyga seasons
1
Lith
Lith